Chlum is a municipality and village in Česká Lípa District in the Liberec Region of the Czech Republic. It has about 300 inhabitants.

Administrative parts
Villages and hamlets of Drchlava, Hradiště and Maršovice are administrative parts of Chlum.

References

Villages in Česká Lípa District